Tursunbek Chygyshevich Chyngyshev (Kyrgyz: Турсунбек Чынгышевич (Чынгыш уулу) Чынгышев, Tursunbek Chynghyshevich (Chynghysh uulu) Chynghyshev) (born 15 October 1942) served as the Prime Minister of Kyrgyzstan from 10 February 1992 to 13 December 1993. He left office due to a motion of no confidence in the Kyrgyz parliament caused by the Seabeco gold scandal.

References

1942 births
Living people
People from Naryn Region
Prime Ministers of Kyrgyzstan